Growing Artichokes in Mimongo (Italian: Cresceranno i carciofi a Mimongo) is a 1996 Italian independent comedy film directed by Fulvio Ottaviano.

For this film Ottaviano won a David di Donatello for best new director.

Cast  
 Daniele Liotti: Sergio Baldini
 Francesca Schiavo: Rita
 Valerio Mastandrea: Enzo 
 Simona Marchini: Stefania 
 Piero Natoli: Paolo Baldini 
 Rocco Papaleo: Esaminatore 
 Niccolò Ammaniti: Fattorino

References

External links

1996 films
1996 comedy films
Italian comedy films
Italian black-and-white films
1996 directorial debut films
1990s Italian films